The Belgian Bowl XXIV was held on June 4, 2011 in Ostend. The West Flanders Tribes were the reigning champion and were defending their title against the Brussels Black Angels. This was the Third time the Tribes and the Black Angels faced each other in the Belgian Bowl (2007, 2008). The Tribes won the game on a windy but sunny gameday with 1350 spectators.

2011 Playoffs
The 2 teams that played in the Belgian Bowl were the winners of the Semi Finals. West Flanders Tribes and Brussels Tigers received byes straight into the Semi Finals since they were the winners of seasonal play in the FFL and LFFAB respectively. The Quarterfinals were played on 15 May and the Semi Finals on 22 May on the homefields of the highest seeded teams.

Most Valuable Players
 MVP Black Angels: #55 Soufian Aissati
 MVP Tribes: #92 Stijn Dossche

Game summary
The Tribes won the toss and chose to receive the kickoff.

Scoring Players 
 12 Goncharov (75yard punt return) Tribes - (1st quarter)
 extra point: 92 Dossche
 Trouillez (45yard run) Black Angels - (1st quarter)
 extra point: Godichal
 Vermaut to 12 Goncharov (5yard pass) Tribes - (2nd quarter)
 extra point: 92 Dossche
 Njufom to T. Bouron (25yard pass) Black Angels - (4th quarter)
 extra point: Godichal
 28 G. George (4yard run) Tribes - (4th quarter)

Tribes total offensive yards : 199 
Black Angels total offensive yards : 185

External links
Official Belgian Bowl website
Dale's FFL thoughts - FFL Blog

References

American football in Belgium
Belgian Bowl
Belgian Bowl